Byans (Nepali:) is a rural area of the Byans Rural Municipality in the Darchula District and Sudurpashchim Province of Nepal. At the time of the 1991 Nepal census, the population was 723; by the 2011 Nepal census, it had dropped to 556.

In March 2017, the Government of Nepal began restructuring local administrative bodies. A total of 753 new local-level units were created. Byans had previously been home to one of the district's village development committees (VDC) but this was merged with surrounding VDCs to form the Byans Rural Municipality. The Byas VDC is now Ward No. 1 within the municipality.

External links
Map of the municipalities of Darchula District, United Nations in Nepal, retrieved 16 November 2019 (includes the Kalapani territory)
Byas VDC on OpenStreetMap, retrieved 16 November 2019 (excludes the Kalapani territory)

References

Populated places in Darchula District